Galactan 1,3-beta-galactosidase (galactan (1->3)-beta-D-galactosidase) is an enzyme with systematic name galactan 3-beta-D-galactosidase. This enzyme catalyses the following chemical reaction

 Hydrolysis of terminal, non-reducing beta-D-galactose residues in (1->3)-beta-D-galactopyranans

This enzyme removes not only free galactose, but also 6-glycosylated residues.

References

External links 
 

EC 3.2.1